Polyphagia or hyperphagia is an abnormally strong, incessant sensation of hunger or desire to eat often leading to overeating. In contrast to an increase in appetite following exercise, polyphagia does not subside after eating and often leads to rapid intake of excessive quantities of food. Polyphagia is not a disorder by itself; rather, it is a symptom indicating an underlying medical condition. It is frequently a result of abnormal blood glucose levels (both hyperglycemia and hypoglycemia), and, along with polydipsia and polyuria, it is one of the "3 Ps" commonly associated with uncontrolled diabetes mellitus.

Studies have shown that cannabinoids, such as the endocannabinoids, Anandamide (AEA: C22H37NO2; 20:4, ω-6), 2-Arachidonilglycerol (2-AG: C23H38O4; 20:4, ω-6), and the phytocannabinoid, Tetrahydrocannabinol (THC: C21H30O2), and sucralose, a noncaloric sweetener present in many food products of daily intake, can provoke hyperphagia, as they enhance the preference for and intake of sweet and high-fat food, by a change in sweet taste perception and therefore the activity of neural nuclei involved in taste and reward.

Etymology and pronunciation 
The word polyphagia uses combining forms of poly- + -phagia, from the Greek words πολύς (polys), "very much" or "many", and φᾰ́γω (phago), "eating" or "devouring".

Underlying conditions and possible causes 
Polyphagia is one of the most common symptoms of diabetes mellitus. It is associated with hyperthyroidism and endocrine diseases, e.g., Graves' disease, and it has also been noted in Prader-Willi syndrome and other genetic conditions caused by chromosomal anomalies. It is only one of several diagnostic criteria for bulimia and is not by itself classified as an eating disorder. As a symptom of Kleine–Levin syndrome, it is sometimes termed megaphagia.

Knocking out vagal nerve receptors has been shown to cause hyperphagia.

Changes in hormones associated with the female menstrual cycle can lead to extreme hunger right before the period. Spikes in estrogen and progesterone and decreased serotonin can lead to cravings for carbohydrates and fats. These can be all part of premenstrual syndrome (PMS).

According to the National Center for Biomedical Information, polyphagia is found in the following conditions:

 Chromosome 22q13 duplication syndrome
 Chromosome 2p25.3 deletion (MYT1L Syndrome)
 Chromosome Xq26.3 duplication syndrome
 Congenital generalized lipodystrophy type 1
 Congenital generalized lipodystrophy type 2
 Diabetes mellitus type 1
 Familial renal glucosuria
 Frontotemporal dementia
 Frontotemporal dementia, ubiquitin-positive
 Graves' disease
 Hypotonia-cystinuria syndrome
 Kleine-Levin syndrome
 Leptin deficiency or dysfunction
 Leptin receptor deficiency
 Luscan-lumish syndrome
 Macrosomia adiposa congenita
 Mental retardation, autosomal dominant 1
 Obesity, hyperphagia, and developmental delay (OBHD)
 Pick's disease
 Prader-Willi syndrome
 Proopiomelanocortin deficiency
 Schaaf-yang syndrome

Polyphagia in diabetes 
Diabetes mellitus causes a disruption in the body's ability to transfer glucose from food into energy. Intake of food causes glucose levels to rise without a corresponding increase in energy, which leads to a persistent sensation of hunger. Polyphagia usually occurs early in the course of diabetic ketoacidosis.  However, once insulin deficiency becomes more severe and ketoacidosis develops, appetite is suppressed.

See also

References

External links 

 Diseases and conditions associated with Polyphagia

 
Symptoms and signs: Endocrinology, nutrition, and metabolism